The Ilin Island cloudrunner (Crateromys paulus) is a critically endangered cloud rat from Ilin Island in the Philippines. It is called siyang by the Taubuwid Mangyan. It is a fluffy-coated, bushy-tailed rat and may have emerged from tree hollows at night to feed on fruits and leaves. It is known from one specimen, collected on 4 April 1953, and presented to the National Museum of Natural History in Washington D.C. The island's forests have been destroyed by human activity. The cloudrunner is among the 25 “most wanted lost” species that are the focus of Global Wildlife Conservation’s “Search for Lost Species” initiative.

References
 Flannery, Tim F., and Peter Schouten. A gap in nature : discovering the world's extinct animals. Melbourne: Text Pub, 2001. Print.
 
Musser, G. G. and M. D. Carleton. 2005. Superfamily Muroidea. pp. 894–1531 in Mammal Species of the World a Taxonomic and Geographic Reference. D. E. Wilson and D. M. Reeder eds. Johns Hopkins University Press, Baltimore.

Specific

Crateromys
Rodents of the Philippines
Mammals described in 1981
Endemic fauna of the Philippines
Fauna of Mindoro